Hamilton Girls' High School is a state single sex secondary school located in central Hamilton, New Zealand. The school caters for students in Years 9 to 13 (ages 12 to 18).

History
Hamilton High School was opened to students on 10 July 1911, on the current site of Hamilton Girls' High School.  The first Principal was Mr Eben Wilson and he was followed by Mr H D Tait in 1937.

In 1955, Hamilton High school was divided into separate boys' and girls' schools, and Hamilton Girls' High School retained the original site with Miss Joan Ellis being the first principal.  She was followed by Miss Lesley Anderson in 1958, Miss Pat Edbrooke in 1969, Mrs Lyn Scott in 1982, Mrs Judith Miles in 1988, Mrs Lil Garland in 1998 and Mrs Mary Ann Baxter 2004. The current principal is Mrs Marie Gordon, who started in 2013.

The buildings have changed significantly over the years – all that remains of the original school is the front steps to the original building, and these now lead to the Wharenui and Wharekai and Maori Language area.  There is a sense of history in the grounds.

The school is supported by a boarding Hostel, Sonninghill, which caters for 130 girls.

The Hamilton High and Girls' High School Old Girls' Association supports Hamilton Girls' High School and has three functions a year which any past pupil can attend.

Notable alumnae

 Jenny Morris (born 1956), musician
 Katherine O'Regan (born 1946), MP for Waipa
 Dame Patsy Reddy (born 1954), lawyer and Governor-General
 Terina Te Tamaki (born 1997), rugby union player and Olympic silver medallist

See also
List of schools in New Zealand

References

External links
 Hamilton Girls' High School Website

Boarding schools in New Zealand
Girls' schools in New Zealand
Educational institutions established in 1911
Secondary schools in Hamilton, New Zealand
Alliance of Girls' Schools Australasia
1911 establishments in New Zealand